The Class 424 is a class of electric multiple units in use on the Hanover S-Bahn network.

Description 
They also lack a third set of doorways in the center of each car.

Naming 
In total, 40 units were built. Some of the units carry names of towns and cities on the Hanover S-Bahn network:

 424 001 Burgdorf
 424 002 Bückeburg
 424 004 Lehrte
 424 005 Wedemark
 424 006 Neustadt am Rübenberge (accidented, out of service)
 424 007 Bad Nenndorf
 424 011 Stadthagen
 424 014 Springe
 424 017 Bad Münder am Deister
 424 018 Celle
 424 019 Minden
 424 021 Wunstorf
 424 024 Seelze
 424 025 Nienburg/Weser
 424 027 Hannover
 424 032 Bad Pyrmont
 424 033 Hameln
 424 035 Haste (accidented, out of service)
 424 037 Langenhagen
 424 038 Barsinghausen
 424 039 Ronnenberg

Electric multiple units of Germany
Hanover S-Bahn

ja:ドイツ鉄道423形電車
15 kV AC multiple units
Bombardier Transportation multiple units
Siemens multiple units